Tokay High School is one of two high schools in Lodi, California, United States, the other being Lodi High School.  Tokay High School is part of the Lodi Unified School District. The school's colors are purple and gold, and its mascot is the tiger. In 2004, the school earned the Lodi Schools' Association Award.

Class colors
Class Color Day is often a semi-annual event at the beginning of each semester to kick off the new term. Each of the four grade levels are designated a color in which to show their class spirit. At the conclusion of the first day of Welcome Back Week, the school assembles for a rally.

 Seniors: orange
 Juniors: green
 Sophomores: black
 Freshmen: white

Notable alumni
 Larry Allen, NFL Hall of Fame offensive lineman
 Chi Cheng, original bassist for the band Deftones; author of poetry anthology The Bamboo Parachute, released in 2000 as a spoken-word album
 David Cooper, MLB player, 17th overall pick of the Toronto Blue Jays
 Nate Diaz, professional MMA fighter; won The Ultimate Fighter 5; UFC lightweight competitor
 Nick Diaz, professional mixed martial artist; currently competing in the Ultimate Fighting Championship; former WEC Welterweight Champion and Strikeforce Welterweight Champion
 Brandi Hitt, reporter/anchor at KABC-TV in Los Angeles
 Stephen Malkmus, musician with the band Pavement
 Reagan Mauia, NFL player with the Arizona Cardinals
 Julius Thomas, NFL tight end for the Jacksonville Jaguars
 Jordan Lawley, former professional basketball player and is now a trainer
 Erin Haight, Disc Jockey Sacramento, Atlanta.
 Eric Crocker, NFL cornerback for the New York Jets and AFL cornerback for San Antonio Talons, Portland Thunder & San Jose SaberCats

References

High schools in San Joaquin County, California
Lodi, California
Public high schools in California
1972 establishments in California